The Washburn Ichabods are the athletic teams that represent Washburn University, located in Topeka, Kansas, in intercollegiate sports as a member of the NCAA Division II ranks, primarily competing in the Mid-America Intercollegiate Athletics Association (MIAA) since the 1989–90 academic year. The Ichabods previously competed in the Central States Intercollegiate Conference (CSIC) of the National Association of Intercollegiate Athletics (NAIA) from 1976–77 to 1988–89; in the Great Plains Athletic Conference (GPAC) from 1972–73 to 1975–76; in the Rocky Mountain Athletic Conference (RMAC) from 1968–69 to 1971–72; in the Central Intercollegiate Athletic Conference (CIC) from 1940–41 to 1967–68 (which they were a member on a previous stint from 1923–24 to 1932–33); as an Independent from 1933–34 to 1939–40; and in the Kansas Collegiate Athletic Conference (KCAC) from 1902–03 to 1922–23.

Nickname 
The "Ichabods" nickname is named after the university's contributor Ichabod Washburn, who was also the founder of Worcester Polytechnic Institute. Prior to the 2013–14 season, the women's athletic teams were known as the "Lady Blues". On May 24, 2013, the Lady Blues nickname was dropped.  President Farley stated that "From the moment a student arrives on campus, until the time they graduate and are alumni, they are "Ichabods", not a "Lady Blue"."

Varsity teams 
Washburn competes in 16 intercollegiate varsity sports: Men's sports include baseball, basketball, cross country, football, golf, tennis and track & field (indoor and outdoor); while women's sports include basketball, cross country, soccer, softball, tennis, track & field (indoor and outdoor) and volleyball.

Basketball

Men's 

Washburn claims one national championship. Washburn won five straight games to claim the 1925 AAU National Championship, becoming the fourth school to claim an AAU title (joining Utah (1916), N.Y.U. (1920), and Butler (1924). They defeated St. Phillips Athletic Club, 34–11, in the final. In 1987, the Washburn men's basketball team defeated West Virginia State 79–77 to win the NAIA national championship at Kemper Arena in Kansas City.

Women's 
Coached by Ron McHenry since 2000, the Ichabods posted a record of 35–2, setting a school record for wins and capturing the NCAA Women's Division II Basketball National Championship by defeating Seattle Pacific University 70–53.

Football 

Washburn began playing Football in 1891 with a record of 1 win and 4 losses. In 1907, under Garfield Weede the team completed a perfect season of 8 wins and 0 losses to be declared champions of the Kansas Conference, forerunner to the Kansas Collegiate Athletic Conference. The program has won 8 conference championships in its history.

The current head coach is Craig Schurig, who has held the position since the start of the 2002 season and led his team to a victory in the Mineral Water Bowl in 2004.
Former coaches at Washburn include John H. Outland, Garfield Weede, Bert Kennedy, Dick Godlove, Ellis Rainsberger, Harold "Bud" Elliott, Tony DeMeo.

Notable alumni 
 Brian Folkerts – NFL and AFL offensive lineman
 Mal Stevens – College Football Hall of Famer
 Cary Williams – Philadelphia Eagles cornerback and Super Bowl XLVII champion with Baltimore Ravens
 Michael Wilhoite – Seattle Seahawks Linebacker
 Corey Ballentine – New York Giants Defensive Back
 Thomas Huber – LTV Steel

References

External links